Assamese Brahmins or Bamun are the Brahmins present in the Assamese society. There are two classes in Assam Bamun and Ganaks.  Brahmins were originally priests. Religious worship in temples is generally carried out by them.

There they promoted learning, Vedic religion and astrology, as well as imparting general vedic knowledge to the public. The Brahmins of Assam are the descendants of early migrants from the Gangetic valley and a succession of influences, ideas and cultures entered Assam with them. The Brahmins and Kayasthas came to Assam from Videha (Mithila) and Kannauj.

History 
Brahmins are considered to be one of the oldest Hindu settlers in the region and held the highest positions in society.

Assamese Brahmins are the community in that state who are considered to have Caucasoid origins.

The earliest historical evidence of settlement of Brahmins in Assam comes from epigraphic sources of the Varman dynasty (350–650). In the late medieval period beginning with the early 16th century, a number of Brahmins from Mithila, Benaras, Kanauj, Bengal and Puri (Srikshetra),  were settled in western Assam by the Koch kings for performing Brahminical rites. During the reign of Nara Narayan (1554-1587) of the Koch dynasty, two Brahmins named Siddhantavagisa and Vidyavagisa were brought from Gauda and Siddhantavagisa was responsible for the spread of Hinduism in the Koch kingdom  Even during the reign of Koch king Prannarayana (1633-1655), Brahmins were brought from Mithilia to serve in the Koch kingdom and this process was later continued by the Ahom state especially under the Tungkhungia Ahom kings with Siva Singha donating 19 out of the 48 landgrants by the Ahom kings to brahmins.
The migration of Brahmins into Assam took place from Central Himalayas as well.
Most of these migration took place due to the foreign invasions in North India and on the invitation by the local rulers.

Tradition and culture

Lagundeoni 
Traditionally, the ceremony of Lagundeoni – one of the Sanskaras or rites of passage marking acceptance of a student by a Guru, is a quite prevalent ritual within the community. A sacred thread – Lagun, given by a Pujari during the ceremony is a symbolic reminder to the young male born to the Brahmin family of his purpose at school, as well as a social marker of the student as someone who has embarked his journey into formal education, where education itself is not limited to ritual and philosophical speculations, but extends to all practical aspects of culture and life in general. The ceremony is typically performed between ages 12 – 14 among Brahmin males.

Death rituals
Brahmins of the Assam valley follow a different death ritual as opposed to the other indigenous communities in Assam. A religious rite, known as Caturthā is performed on the 4th day of a person's demise unlike Tiloni, performed on the 3rd day of person's demise by non–Brahmin indigenous communities.

Pujas
Most Brahmin families are involved in performing religious rituals. These are known as Pujas.
The main Pujas are as follows - 
Satyanarayan Puja, Durga Puja, Laxmi Puja, Shiva Puja, Ganesha Puja, Saraswati Puja, Annapura Puja, Jagadhatri Puja, and others.

Lifestyle
Although in general Brahmins observe all the customary rituals, they appear usually less rigid in some of their traditional lifestyle choices, such as they may eat meat, fish, unlike their counterparts in North India.

Present 
The Brahmins constitute one of the Forward classes of Assam based on the classifications of Government of India, although the recent trend on economic condition has not been very well within the community. Assam's former Chief Minister, Tarun Gogoi announced setting up of development councils for several communities in the state, including Brahmins.

See also
Manipuri Brahmins
Assamese people
Bengali Brahmins

Notes

References

Published-sources

Internet

Brahmin communities of Assam
Brahmin communities by language
Brahmin communities across India